Diego Schwartzman was the defending champion, but did not qualify this year.
Íñigo Cervantes won the title, defeating Daniel Muñoz de la Nava in the final, 6–2, 3–6, 7–6(7–4). Cervantes also became the first undefeated champion of the event.

Seeds

Draw

Finals

Group A
Standings are determined by: 1. number of wins; 2. number of matches; 3. in two-players-ties, head-to-head records; 4. in three-players-ties, percentage of sets won, or of games won initially to sort out a superior/inferior player, then head-to-head records; 5. ATP rankings.

Group B
Standings are determined by: 1. number of wins; 2. number of matches; 3. in two-players-ties, head-to-head records; 4. in three-players-ties, percentage of sets won, or of games won initially to sort out a superior/inferior player, then head-to-head records; 5. ATP rankings.

References
Main Draw

Finals
2015 Singles
2015 in Brazilian tennis